The 1914 WAFL season was the 30th season of senior Australian rules football in Perth, Western Australia.

Ladder

Finals

Grand Final

References

West Australian Football League seasons
WAFL